Humaidan may refer to:

Kristian Humaidan (born 1981), Danish rapper better known as UFO and member of duo UFO & Yepha
Nawaf Al Humaidan (born 1981), Kuwaiti football (soccer) player

See also
Humaidania or Hamidaniyeh, village in Mollasani Rural District, in the Central District of Bavi County, Khuzestan Province, Iran